The New Zealand Women's Open was a women's professional golf tournament on the ALPG Tour. It was founded in 2009 and became a co-sanctioned event on the Ladies European Tour the following year. The 2017 edition was co-sanctioned by the LPGA Tour and not the LET.

Winners
Co-sanctioned by the LPGA Tour

External links

Coverage on the LPGA Tour's official site

ALPG Tour events
Former LPGA Tour events
Former Ladies European Tour events
Golf tournaments in New Zealand
International Sports Promotion Society
Recurring sporting events established in 2009
Recurring sporting events disestablished in 2017
2009 establishments in New Zealand
2017 disestablishments in New Zealand